Montorgiali is a village in Tuscany, central Italy,  administratively a frazione of the comune of Scansano, province of Grosseto. At the time of the 2001 census its population amounted to 141.

Montorgiali is about 21 km from Grosseto and 10 km from Scansano, and it is situated on a hill along the Scansanese Provincial Road.

Main sights 
 San Biagio (12th century), main parish church of the village
 Sanctuary of San Giorgio, old pieve during the Middle Ages, it is now a sanctuary dedicated to Saint George who, according to legend, defeated a dragon
 Castle of Montorgiali (12th century), main palace in the village

References

Bibliography 

 Aldo Mazzolai, Guida della Maremma. Percorsi tra arte e natura, Le Lettere, Florence, 1997.
 Giuseppe Guerrini, Torri e castelli della Provincia di Grosseto, Nuova Immagine Editrice, Siena, 1999.

See also 
 Baccinello
 Murci
 Pancole, Scansano
 Poggioferro
 Polveraia
 Pomonte, Scansano
 Preselle

Frazioni of Scansano